William Hardy may refer to:

 Billy Hardy (born 1964), English bantamweight and featherweight boxer
 Billy Hardy (footballer) (1891–1981), English footballer
 W. G. Hardy (1895–1979), Canadian professor, writer, ice hockey administrator
 William Hardy (actor) (1933–2008), American actor and theatre director
 William Hardy (archivist) (1807–1887), British archivist and Deputy Keeper of the Public Record Office
 William Hardy (Australian politician) (fl. 1861), member of the New South Wales Legislative Council
 William Bate Hardy (1864–1934), British biologist
 William H. Hardy (1837–1917), American founder of Hattiesburg
 William Henry Hardy (1831–?), Democratic politician
 Willie Hardy (1922–2007), Democratic politician
 William John Hardy (1857–1919), English archivist and antiquarian
 William Le Hardy (1889–1961), English archivist
 Will Hardy (born 1988), American National Basketball Association Coach

See also
William Hardie (disambiguation)